Diana Davis may refer to:

 Diana Davis (Диана Сергеевна Дэвис; born 2003), Russian ice dancer
 Diana Davis (Sliders), a character from Sliders